The Byers-Lyons House (now Byers Hall of the Community College of Allegheny County's Allegheny Campus) in the Allegheny West neighborhood of  Pittsburgh, Pennsylvania, is a building from 1898. It was added to the List of City of Pittsburgh historic designations on March 15, 1974, the National Register of Historic Places on November 19, 1974, and the List of Pittsburgh History and Landmarks Foundation Historic Landmarks in 1989.

References

External links

Houses on the National Register of Historic Places in Pennsylvania
Houses completed in 1898
Renaissance Revival architecture in Pennsylvania
Houses in Pittsburgh
City of Pittsburgh historic designations
Pittsburgh History & Landmarks Foundation Historic Landmarks
Historic American Buildings Survey in Pennsylvania
National Register of Historic Places in Pittsburgh